The following is a list of the 51 municipalities (comuni) of the Province of Nuoro, Sardinia, Italy.

See also 
List of municipalities of Italy

References 

Nuoro